Bienvenue Basala-Mazana (born 2 January 1992) is a German professional footballer who plays as a right-back.

Club career
Basala-Mazana won the 2009 UEFA European Under-17 Championship with the Germany U17 national team.

In January 2020, he returned to the pitch after three years without a club, signing with German amateur club FC 08 Viktoria Arnoldsweiler.

Honours
Germany U17
 UEFA European Under-17 Championship: 2009

References

External links

1992 births
Living people
German sportspeople of Democratic Republic of the Congo descent
Sportspeople from Bonn
German footballers
Footballers from North Rhine-Westphalia
Association football fullbacks
Austrian Football Bundesliga players
Regionalliga players
1. FC Köln players
1. FC Köln II players
SV Ried players
Berliner AK 07 players
German expatriate footballers
German expatriate sportspeople in Austria
Expatriate footballers in Austria
German expatriate sportspeople in Portugal
Expatriate footballers in Portugal